Moores Mill is an unincorporated community and census-designated place (CDP) in Madison County, Alabama, United States, and is included in the Huntsville-Decatur Combined Statistical Area. The population was 6,729 at the 2020 census, up from 5,682 at the 2010 census.

Geography
Moores Mill is located in northern Madison County at  (34.830662, -86.520538). It is bordered to the west by Meridianville and to the south by Huntsville.

Demographics

2000 census
As of the census of 2000, there were 5,178 people, 1,912 households, and 1,500 families residing in the CDP. The racial makeup of the CDP was 77.62% White, 18.58% Black or African American, 1.31% Native American, 0.79% Asian, 0.02% Pacific Islander, 0.10% from other races, and 1.58% from two or more races. 0.98% of the population were Hispanic or Latino of any race.

There were 1,912 households, out of which 38.9% had children under the age of 18 living with them, 66.6% were married couples living together, 8.6% had a female householder with no husband present, and 21.5% were non-families. 18.3% of all households were made up of individuals, and 4.1% had someone living alone who was 65 years of age or older. The average household size was 2.71 and the average family size was 3.09.

In the CDP, the population was spread out, with 27.9% under the age of 18, 7.4% from 18 to 24, 34.7% from 25 to 44, 22.4% from 45 to 64, and 7.6% who were 65 years of age or older. The median age was 35 years. For every 100 females, there were 100.7 males. For every 100 females age 18 and over, there were 98.8 males.

The median income for a household in the CDP was $50,292, and the median income for a family was $53,750. Males had a median income of $32,303 versus $25,449 for females. The per capita income for the CDP was $20,158. About 6.9% of families and 9.9% of the population were below the poverty line, including 14.7% of those under age 18 and 13.8% of those age 65 or over.

2010 census
As of the census of 2010, there were 5,682 people, 2,204 households, and 1,673 families residing in the CDP. The racial makeup of the CDP was 70.9% White, 22.6% Black or African American, 1.1% Native American, 1.5% Asian, 0.1% Pacific Islander, 0.9% from other races, and 2.8% from two or more races. 2.4% of the population were Hispanic or Latino of any race.

There were 2,204 households, out of which 31.5% had children under the age of 18 living with them, 59.8% were married couples living together, 11.2% had a female householder with no husband present, and 24.1% were non-families. 20.8% of all households were made up of individuals, and 5.9% had someone living alone who was 65 years of age or older. The average household size was 2.58 and the average family size was 2.97.

In the CDP, the population was spread out, with 23.2% under the age of 18, 7.6% from 18 to 24, 26.9% from 25 to 44, 31.3% from 45 to 64, and 11.0% who were 65 years of age or older. The median age was 39.9 years. For every 100 females, there were 96.3 males. For every 100 females age 18 and over, there were 96.2 males.

The median income for a household in the CDP was $67,449, and the median income for a family was $79,010. Males had a median income of $47,981 versus $40,257 for females. The per capita income for the CDP was $30,155. About 6.8% of families and 10.1% of the population were below the poverty line, including 13.6% of those under age 18 and 9.5% of those age 65 or over.

2020 census

As of the 2020 United States census, there were 6,729 people, 2,683 households, and 1,974 families residing in the CDP.

Education
The local school district is Madison County Schools.

References

Census-designated places in Madison County, Alabama
Census-designated places in Alabama
Huntsville-Decatur, AL Combined Statistical Area